Badraq-e Aneh Galdi (also Romanized as Badrāq-e Āneh Galdī; also known as Badrāq-e Ānāgolī and Badrāq-e Ānāgaldī) is a village in Katul Rural District, in the Central District of Aliabad County, Golestan Province, Iran. At the 2006 census, its population was 423, in 82 families.

References 

Populated places in Aliabad County